Veena Pandey is an Indian politician who is a former member of the Uttar Pradesh Legislative Council. She was Student Union Vice-President at Banaras Hindu University from 1982–83. Veena Pandey has held the post of Uttar Pradesh BJP General Secretary, and is also the national Vice-President of BJP Mahila Morcha. She has been a member of the National Executive of the Bharatiya Janata Party from 2012 until 2015.

References

Women in Uttar Pradesh politics
Living people
Year of birth missing (living people)
20th-century Indian women politicians
20th-century Indian politicians
21st-century Indian women politicians
21st-century Indian politicians
Bharatiya Janata Party politicians from Uttar Pradesh